The men's 80 kg  competition in taekwondo at the 2000 Summer Olympics in Sydney took place on 29 September at the State Sports Centre.

Cuban fighter Ángel Matos overcame his mother's death to defeat Germany's Faissal Ebnoutalib 3–1 for the gold medal in the men's welterweight class. Meanwhile, Mexico's Victor Estrada handily defeated Sweden's Roman Livaja in a tight match 2–1 to pick up the bronze.

Competition format
The main bracket consisted of a single elimination tournament, culminating in the gold medal match. The taekwondo fighters eliminated in earlier rounds by the two finalists of the main bracket advanced directly to the repechage tournament. These matches determined the bronze medal winner for the event.

Schedule
All times are Greece Standard Time (UTC+2)

Competitors

Results
Legend
PTG — Won by points gap
SUP — Won by superiority
OT — Won on over time (Golden Point)
WO — Walkover

Main bracket

Repechage

References

External links
Official Report

Men's 080 kg
Men's events at the 2000 Summer Olympics